Gonodactylaceus, is a genus of mantis shrimp. The genus was first described in 1995 by Raymond Brendan Manning and contains the following species:

 Gonodactylaceus falcatus (Forskål, 1775)
 Gonodactylaceus glabrous (Brooks, 1886)
 Gonodactylaceus graphurus (Miers, 1875)
 Gonodactylaceus randalli (Manning, 1978)
 Gonodactylaceus ternatensis (de Man, 1902)

References

Stomatopoda
Taxa named by Raymond B. Manning
Crustaceans described in 1995